The Musée des Beaux-Arts de Rouen is an art museum in Rouen, in Normandy in north-western France. Its collections include paintings, sculptures, drawings and objets d'art.

History

The museum was established by Napoléon Bonaparte in 1801. The collections include paintings, sculptures, drawings and objets d'art from the Renaissance to the present day, including a collection of Russian icons dating from the fifteenth to the early nineteenth century, and some 8000 drawings. The Depeaux collection of Impressionist works was donated to the museum in 1909.

Paintings

The museum holds paintings of several European schools from the sixteenth century to the present day. Among them is work by:
 sixteenth century: Jacopo Bassano, Annibale Carracci, François Clouet, Gerard David, Perugino and Veronese
 seventeenth century: Caravaggio, Philippe de Champaigne, Van Dyck, Luca Giordano, Guercino, Laurent de La Hyre, Pierre Mignard, Nicolas Poussin, Jusepe de Ribera, Rubens, Eustache Le Sueur, Diego Velázquez, Simon Vouet and John Michael Wright.
 eighteenth century: François Boucher, Fragonard, Francesco Guardi, Élisabeth Vigée Le Brun, Pietro Longhi, Hyacinthe Rigaud and Hubert Robert.
 nineteenth century: Gustave Caillebotte, Eugène Carrière, Corot, Édouard Joseph Dantan, Jacques-Louis David, Degas, Delacroix, Géricault, Ingres, Monet, Gustave Moreau, Camille Pissarro, Renoir and Sisley
 twentieth century: André Derain, Jean Dubuffet, Marcel Duchamp, Raoul Dufy, Amedeo Modigliani, Robert Antoine Pinchon, Jacques Villon and Édouard Vuillard.

Selected works

Sculptures
The Musée des Beaux-Arts de Rouen houses a lost statue by Pierre Paul Puget. This statue of Hercules slaying the Hydra of Lerna was originally in the castle of Vaudreuil, and was discovered, in 1882, by Adolphe-André Porée on the grounds of the Biéville-Beuville castle.

References

Rouen
Museums in Rouen
Art museums established in 1801
1801 establishments in France